The river Khan is an ephemeral river crossing the Erongo region of central Namibia. It is the main tributary of the Swakop River and only occasionally carries surface water during the rain seasons in November and February/March.

The Khan has its origin near the settlement of Otjisemba, north-west of Okahandja. From there the river course passes westwards to the town of Usakos, and further in a south-western direction through the Namib desert. It  has its confluence with the Swakop River 40 km east of Swakopmund.

It is a popular tourist attraction due to the proliferation of mammals such as the klipspringer antelope, ostriches and jackals.

References

Rivers of Namibia
Geography of Khomas Region
Geography of Otjozondjupa Region